is a Japanese footballer who plays as a left back for Vissel Kobe in the J1 League having previously turned out for Gamba Osaka.

International career
In May 2017, Hatsuse was elected Japan U-20 national team for 2017 U-20 World Cup. At this tournament, he played 2 matches as right side back. He was called up to the senior Japan team as part of their squad at the 2017 EAFF E-1 Football Championship.

Club statistics

Last update: 2 December 2018

Reserves performance

Honors

Gamba Osaka

Emperor's Cup - 2015

References

External links

1997 births
Living people
People from Kishiwada, Osaka
Association football people from Osaka Prefecture
Japanese footballers
Japan youth international footballers
J1 League players
J2 League players
J3 League players
Gamba Osaka players
Gamba Osaka U-23 players
Vissel Kobe players
Avispa Fukuoka players
Association football fullbacks
Footballers at the 2018 Asian Games
Asian Games silver medalists for Japan
Asian Games medalists in football
Medalists at the 2018 Asian Games